The Völkisch Work Community (Völkische Werkgemeinschaft) was a German fascist movement founded and led by Otto Dickel that existed from the 1920s until 1933, which was not associated with Nazism.

History
The movement was one of a number of Völkisch nationalist movements that existed in Germany during the Weimar Republic era and in 1921, the Nazi Party under the leadership of Anton Drexler attempted to negotiate with Dickel to merge the Volkisch Work Community with the Nazi Party and the German Socialist Party. However such plans were scrapped when Adolf Hitler, then only a member of the Nazi party, vehemently rejected the plan and threatened to resign from the Nazi Party, if the Nazis agreed to merge with the German Socialist Party and the Völkisch Work Community, Hitler personally accused Dickel of being an enemy of National Socialism. Over time, Dickel gradually drifted away from his economic statism, and by the 1930s he had become a proponent of laissez-faire capitalism.

Otto Dickel spoke of the need to revive of the German nation as well as German and Western culture, supported the creation of a Greater German nation and wanted to abandon what he saw as a cowardly contemporary culture. he stated:

References

Far-right political parties in Germany
Fascist parties in Germany
German nationalist organizations
German nationalist political parties